To Nisi (Greek: Το Νησί; English: The Island) is a Greek television series based on the best-selling English novel The Island by Victoria Hislop airing on Mega Channel. The series premiered on 11 October 2010 to record ratings and critical acclaim, and is scheduled for twenty-six episodes. It is one of the most expensive Greek television productions ever with a budget of €4 million. After airing on television, each episode is also available for streaming via Mega Channel's website.

Series overview

Season 1

References

External links 
 
 

To Nisi